"Four Letter Word" is the fourth single from English pop singer Kim Wilde's sixth studio album, Close (1988). The song was issued as a single in November 1988, marking Wilde's last release of a track written by her father and brother, who had written the majority of her early hits together. "Four Letter Word" became Wilde's third consecutive UK top-10 single from "Close", reaching number six. It also peaked within the top 10 in Belgium, Denmark, Ireland, and the Netherlands. An extended version as well as a "late night" remix of "Four Letter Word" were released on the 12-inch and CD singles.

Track listings
7-inch and Japanese mini-CD single
 "Four Letter Word"
 "She Hasn't Got Time for You '88"

12-inch single
A1. "Four Letter Word" (extended version) – 5:52
B1. "Four Letter Word" (late night mix) – 3:52
B2. "She Hasn't Got Time for You '88" – 4:36

CD and European mini-CD single
 "Four Letter Word" – 4:01
 "She Hasn't Got Time for You '88" – 4:36
 "Four Letter Word" (extended version) – 5:46

Charts

Weekly charts

Year-end charts

References

Kim Wilde songs
1988 songs
Songs written by Ricky Wilde
Songs written by Marty Wilde